Gargantua is an American 1998 giant monster television film, starring Adam Baldwin, Julie Carmen and Emile Hirsch. It was directed by Bradford May and written by Ronald Parker. The film was shot on location throughout Gold Coast, Queensland, Australia.

Plot
On the island of Malau, marine biologist Jack Ellway (Adam Baldwin) studies the effect of seismic activity on the area's marine life. A string of mysterious drownings soon turns their research project into a beachfront disaster as Jack learns that a nearby underwater trench is home to a family of giant amphibians that have mutated after prolonged exposure to buried pesticides. As Jack and local doctor Alyson Hart (Julie Carmen) explore the surrounding ocean for the creatures, the military comes and tries to investigate. Jack's son, Brandon (Emile Hirsch), discovers and befriends a baby creature that is able to leave the ocean and walk on land, and the parent creature tries to find the baby and go on a rampage. After its first rampage, the military gets involved and kills the parent. The next morning, it turns out that there is another parent, and it returns to the ocean with the baby.

Cast
 Adam Baldwin as Dr. Jack Ellway
 Julie Carmen as Dr. Alyson Hart
 Emile Hirsch as Brandon Ellway
 Bobby Hosea as Coronel Wayne
 Doug Penty as Paul Bateman
 Peter Adams as Dr. Ralph Hale
 Alexander Petersons as Derek Lawson
 Monroe Reimers as Presidente Manny Moki
 Darren Selby as Kikko
 Tony Briggs as Police Chief
 Don Battee as T J

In other media
Gargantua was novelized by K. Robert Andreassi, a pseudonym for Keith R.A. DeCandido, and published by Tor Books.

Reception
Gargantua made its television premiere on the same night that one of its rival projects, Godzilla (1998), had its theatrical release. Gargantua holds a 21% rating on Rotten Tomatoes.

Julie Carmen was nominated for the ALMA Award in 1999 for her performance in this movie. She was indicated in the category "Outstanding Individual Performance in a Made-for-Television Movie or Mini-Series in a Crossover Role".

References

External links
 

1998 films
American television films
Giant monster films
Films directed by Bradford May
1990s English-language films